Sherzod Temirov (Uzbek Cyrillic: Шерзод Темиров; born 27 October 1998) is an Uzbek professional footballer who plays as a left winger and striker for Persian Gulf Pro League club Paykan.

Club

Persepolis 
On 28 February 2022, Temirov signed an 18-month contract with Persian Gulf Pro League champions Persepolis.

Career statistics

International career 
Temirov made his debut for the Uzbekistan national football team in a 3-0 friendly win over South Sudan on 27 January 2022 (substitute with Eldor Shomurodov in 72 minute).

Honours 

Pakhtakor
 Uzbekistan Super League (1): 2021
 Uzbekistan Cup (1): 2020
 Uzbekistan Super Cup (1): 2021

References

External links 
 
 

1998 births
Living people
Uzbekistani footballers
Uzbekistani expatriate footballers
Expatriate footballers in Iran
Pakhtakor Tashkent FK players
Association football forwards
Persepolis F.C. players
Persian Gulf Pro League players
Uzbekistan Super League players
FC Nasaf players
FK Mash'al Mubarek players
Uzbekistani expatriate sportspeople in Iran